Mr Faint-Heart is a 1931 comedy play by the British writer Ian Hay. It was staged at the  Shaftesbury Theatre in London's West End between 20 April and 20 June 1931.

In 1935 it was adapted into a film All at Sea directed by Anthony Kimmins and starring Tyrell Davis, Googie Withers and Rex Harrison.

A mild-mannered man inherits some money and goes on a cruise around the Mediterranean. To impress a lady on board, he pretends to be a famous writer, but this soon gets him into complications.

References

Bibliography
 Goble, Alan. The Complete Index to Literary Sources in Film. Walter de Gruyter, 1999.
 Wearing, J.P. The London Stage 1930-1939: A Calendar of Productions, Performers, and Personnel.  Rowman & Littlefield, 2014.

1931 plays
Plays by Ian Hay
British plays adapted into films
Comedy plays
West End plays